Hello, Dear Wind is the second album by Maryland indie-folk band Page France. It was released in 2005 on Fall Records, then re-released on September 12, 2006 on Suicide Squeeze.

The opening track, "Chariot," was featured on Episode 12 of the third season of Weeds, "The Dark Time"; "Jesus" in Episode 6 of the same season.

Track listing
Chariot - 3:39
Jesus - 3:30
Dogs - 3:35
Elephant - 3:03
Junkyard - 2:47
Bush - 2:46
Windy - 3:53
Grass - 1:53
Glue - 3:45
Up - 2:13
Finders - 1:38
Trampoline - 3:26
Goodness - 2:52
Feather - 6:34

References

External links
SuicideSqueeze.net

Suicide Squeeze Records albums
2005 albums
Page France albums